The 2015 Nigerian Senate election in Federal Capital Territory was held on March 28, 2015, to elect the member of the Nigerian Senate to represent Federal Capital Territory. Philips Tanimu Aduda representing FCT Senatorial District won on the platform of Peoples Democratic Party.

Overview

Summary

Results

FCT Senatorial District 
Peoples Democratic Party candidate Philips Tanimu Aduda won the election, defeating All Progressives Congress candidate Adamu Muhammad and other party candidates.

References 

2015 Nigerian Senate elections
Federal Capital Territory Senate elections